Dade County is a county in the U.S. state of Georgia. It occupies the northwest corner of Georgia, and the county's own northwest corner is the westernmost point in the state. As of the 2020 census, the population is 16,251. The county seat and only incorporated municipality is Trenton. Dade County is part of the Chattanooga, TN–GA Metropolitan Statistical Area. In 1860, residents of Dade County voted to secede from the state of Georgia and from the United States, but no government outside the county ever recognized this gesture as legal. In 1945, the county symbolically "rejoined" Georgia and the United States.

History
Dade County was established in 1837 and was named for Major Francis Langhorne Dade, who was killed in the Dade Massacre by Seminole Indians in December 1835. The first settlers of Dade County won the land in the Georgia Land Lotteries, held to encourage settlement after the Cherokee people were forced off the land. Many settlers worked in regional coke and coal mines that contributed to development of the Chattanooga, Tennessee area.

The area was long isolated by its geography of mountains and rivers, which some historians say contributed to early residents' separatist attitudes. For the first century of Dade County's existence, no road connected it directly to the rest of Georgia, so visitors from elsewhere in the state had to reach it by way of Alabama or Tennessee. That changed in 1939 with the establishment of Cloudland Canyon State Park, and Georgia began work on Highway 136 to connect U.S. 41 to the recently created park. The Civilian Conservation Corps built many of the facilities and access roads to the park.

Dade County had a short-lived state secessionist movement before the American Civil War. In 1860, county residents wanted to secede from the Union, but lawmakers for the state of Georgia were cautious. Legend has it that in 1860, the people of Dade County were so impatient that they announced their own secession from both Georgia and the United States. On July 4, 1945, a telegram from President Harry S. Truman was read at a celebration marking the county's "rejoining" the Union. Historians say Dade's individual secession and readmission were symbolic and had no legal effect. They say that officially, Dade County seceded along with the state of Georgia in 1861 and re-entered the Union with the state in 1870.

The noted Southern humorist, author and seminal writer of Southern humor George Washington Harris (1814-1869) is buried in the Brock Cemetery in Trenton.  Although he greatly influenced the literary works of Mark Twain, William Faulkner, and Flannery O'Connor, his grave was not verified and given a marker until 2008.

In 1964, Covenant College established a campus at Lookout Mountain. Founded in 1955 in California, it was ready to expand after a year. Several professors led Covenant to move to St. Louis, Missouri, where it developed for eight years. After outgrowing its facilities there, the college decided to move to Dade County.

Quarter controversy 

Shortly after the Georgia State Quarter was released by the US Mint, Dade County gained attention because of an apparent mistake in the design. As shown on the quarter, the state appears to lack Dade County, in the extreme northwestern part of the state. Some accounts in 2012 suggest the exclusion was intended to refer to the local legend of Dade County's secession from Georgia.

Geography

The county, like most of northwest Georgia, is entrenched in the southern Appalachian Mountains. In addition, a vast majority of the county is located in the Middle Tennessee-Chickamauga sub-basin of the Middle Tennessee-Hiwassee basin. A very small part of the southernmost tip of the county is located in the Upper Coosa River sub-basin in the ACT River Basin (Coosa-Tallapoosa River Basin), while a small part of the westernmost portion of Dade County is located in the Guntersville Lake sub-basin in the Middle Tennessee-Elk basin.

Major highways

Adjacent counties
 Marion County, Tennessee (north/CST Border)
 Hamilton County, Tennessee (northeast)
 Walker County (southeast)
 DeKalb County, Alabama (southwest/CST Border)
 Jackson County, Alabama (west/CST Border)

Protected areas
 Chickamauga and Chattanooga National Military Park (part)
 Cloudland Canyon State Park

Demographics

2000 census
As of the census of 2000, there were 15,154 people, 5,633 households, and 4,264 families living in the county. There were 6,224 housing units at an average density of 36 per square mile (14/km2). The racial makeup of the county was 97.51% White, 0.63% Black or African American, 0.49% Native American, 0.38% Asian, 0.03% Pacific Islander, 0.20% from other races, and 0.76% from two or more races.  0.90% of the population were Hispanic or Latino of any race.

There were 5,633 households, out of which 33.30% had children under the age of 18 living with them, 62.70% were married couples living together, 9.50% had a female householder with no husband present, and 24.30% were non-families. 21.70% of all households were made up of individuals, and 8.20% had someone living alone who was 65 years of age or older.  The average household size was 2.55 and the average family size was 2.97.

In the county, the population was spread out, with 23.80% under the age of 18, 11.80% from 18 to 24, 27.80% from 25 to 44, 24.50% from 45 to 64, and 12.00% who were 65 years of age or older.  The median age was 36 years. For every 100 females there were 96.00 males.  For every 100 females age 18 and over, there were 91.80 males.

The median income for a household in the county was $35,259, and the median income for a family was $39,481. Males had a median income of $31,534 versus $21,753 for females. The per capita income for the county was $16,127.  About 7.50% of families and 9.70% of the population were below the poverty line, including 7.40% of those under age 18 and 12.50% of those age 65 or over.

2010 census
As of the 2010 United States Census, there were 16,633 people, 6,291 households, and 4,462 families living in the county. The racial makeup of the county was 96.0% white, 0.9% black or African American, 0.7% Asian, 0.4% American Indian, 0.1% Pacific islander, 0.6% from other races, and 1.3% from two or more races. Those of Hispanic or Latino origin made up 1.8% of the population. In terms of ancestry, 21.2% were American, 18.1% were Irish, 11.4% were German, and 9.4% were English.

Of the 6,291 households, 31.6% had children under the age of 18 living with them, 56.2% were married couples living together, 10.4% had a female householder with no husband present, 29.1% were non-families, and 25.1% of all households were made up of individuals. The average household size was 2.49 and the average family size was 2.96. The median age was 39.0 years.

The median income for a household in the county was $39,760 and the median income for a family was $48,881. Males had a median income of $41,618 versus $26,521 for females. The per capita income for the county was $20,168. About 10.7% of families and 15.5% of the population were below the poverty line, including 25.8% of those under age 18 and 10.8% of those age 65 or over.

2020 census

As of the 2020 United States census, there were 16,251 people, 6,195 households, and 4,539 families residing in the county.

Education

Georgia water supply 
Dade County lies just south of Nickajack Lake on the Tennessee River, which was created by the Nickajack Dam, constructed by the Tennessee Valley Authority. The city of Atlanta, Georgia wanted to gain rights to the water in Nickajack Lake to supplement their sources from Lake Lanier and Lake Allatoona. In addition, in 2008 Georgia lawmakers wanted to change the Tennessee-Georgia state line, as they say it is based on a flawed 1818 survey, which mistakenly placed Georgia's northern line just short of the Tennessee River. Changing the boundary would give Georgia rights to the water, but they were unsuccessful.

Politics
Although it contained many opponents of the Confederacy during the Civil War, Dade County – unlike more easterly Fannin, Towns, Pickens and Gilmer – is a typical “Solid South” county in its political history. It voted Democratic in every presidential election until 1964, when hostility towards civil rights for blacks turned the county towards conservative Republican Barry Goldwater. Since then, only twice has a Republican presidential candidate lost Dade County: when segregationist former and future Alabama Governor George Wallace carried the county in 1968 and when favorite son Jimmy Carter won in 1976. In 1972, Dade was Richard Nixon’s strongest county nationwide in his 2,900-plus-county landslide over George McGovern, and since 1984 no Democratic presidential candidate has reached 38 percent of the county’s vote. Typical for the rural white south, Hillary Clinton received only 15.5 percent of the county’s vote in 2016. In 2016 and 2020, Donald Trump received over 80% of the popular vote, the highest percentage received by a Republican candidate since 1972.

Communities

Cities 
 Trenton

Census-designated places 
 New England
 West Brow
 Wildwood

Other unincorporated communities 
 Head River
 Hooker
 Morganville
 New Home
 New Salem
Rising Fawn

Ghost towns 

 Cole City
 Tatum

Notable people from Dade County 
 The Forester Sisters

See also 

 National Register of Historic Places listings in Dade County, Georgia
 Northwest Georgia Joint Development Authority
 Town Line, New York, seceded from the United States (unrecognized) and rejoined in 1946.
List of counties in Georgia

References

External links
 Dade County historical marker

 
1837 establishments in Georgia (U.S. state)
Populated places established in 1837
Georgia (U.S. state) counties
Chattanooga metropolitan area counties
Northwest Georgia (U.S.)
Counties of Appalachia